The School District of University City is a school district headquartered in University City, Missouri in Greater St. Louis. The school district is overseen by Superintendent Dr. Sharonica Hardin-Bartley.

Administration

Superintendent 
The Superintendent of the School District of University City is Sharonica Hardin-Bartley. Prior to her appointment as superintendent in July 2016, she was the assistant superintendent for human resources and leadership development for the Ritenour School District, as well as the chief human resources officer for St. Louis Public Schools.

Board of Education 
There are 7 members of the Board of Education and one student representative:

 Matt Bellows, President
 Lisa Brenner, Vice President
 Laverne Ford-Williams, Secretary
 George Lenard
 Traci Moore
 Joanne Soudah
 Monica Stewart
 Michael Simmons, Student Representative

Schools
There are 7 schools that are a part of the School District of University City.

Elementary Schools 
 Julia Goldstein Early Childhood Education Center (Pre-K)
 Barbara C. Jordan Elementary School (K-5)
 Flynn Park Elementary School (K-5)
 Jackson Park Elementary School (K-5)
 Pershing Elementary School (K-5)

Secondary Schools 

 Brittany Woods Middle School (6-8)
 University City High School

Students who are differently abled are referred to the Special School District of St. Louis County (SSD) facilities. University City School District residents are zoned to Litzsinger School (Aged 5-13) in Ladue and Neuwoehner High School (Aged 14-21) in Town and Country.

References

External links
 

Education in St. Louis County, Missouri
School districts in Missouri